Abdullah Moazami was an Iranian lawyer and politician. He taught at University of Tehran and was a member of Parliament of Iran for four consecutive terms from 1944 to 1953. Moazami came from an upper-class and titled landlord family and has been described as a "man of moderate demeanor and connected with several factions by both family and politics".

In 1952, he lost to the royalist cleric Hassan Emami for the Speaker of the Parliament of Iran. On 1 July 1953, he was elected as the speaker by a vote of 41 to 31, with one abstention.

After the 1953 Iranian coup d'état, he was briefly imprisoned.

His brother, Seyfollah Moazami, served as minister of post & telegraph under Government of Mohammad Mosaddegh.

References 

1900s births
Year of birth uncertain
1971 deaths
People from Golpayegan
Iran Party politicians
National Front (Iran) MPs
20th-century Iranian lawyers
University of Paris alumni
Academic staff of the University of Tehran
Speakers of the National Consultative Assembly
Members of the 14th Iranian Majlis
Members of the 15th Iranian Majlis
Members of the 16th Iranian Majlis
Members of the 17th Iranian Majlis